The Unbelievable Truth is a 1989 American comedy-drama film written and directed by Hal Hartley and starring Adrienne Shelly and Robert Burke. It tells the story of Audry, who dumps her high-school boyfriend and becomes a successful fashion model, but all along is in love with a mysterious man called Josh, released after conviction for manslaughter. He, after his experiences, is uncomfortable with relationships, but learns that he cannot stay an observer of life and must fight to win her. The film was nominated for a Grand Jury Prize in 1990 at the Sundance Film Festival.

Plot
Back from prison to a small community on Long Island comes Josh, a sober young man whose crimes most cannot remember exactly, and finds a job at Vic's auto repair shop. Vic's daughter Audry falls instantly in love with him, only to be rejected when she declares her feelings because he is not ready for such a relationship and fears Vic's reaction. In revenge, she gives up the place she has won at Harvard and goes off to New York to be a photographic model, appearing first in lingerie and then nude.

Horrified, her parents send the reliable Josh off to the city to reclaim her, but he gives up in disgust when he finds she is living with her agent. Returning home, he meets the daughter of the man he is supposed to have killed in a struggle, who says she can testify that he is innocent. Audry, overjoyed that Josh has re-entered her life, gives her money-obsessed father all her earnings from exposing herself and again offers herself to Josh, who this time is overjoyed too.

Cast

 Adrienne Shelly as Audry Hugo
 Robert Burke as Joshua "Josh" Hutton
 Christopher Cooke as Vic Hugo
 Julia McNeal as Pearl
 Katherine Mayfield as Liz Hugo
 Gary Sauer as Emmet
 Mark Bailey as Mike
 David Healy as Todd Whitbread
 Matt Malloy as Otis
 Edie Falco as Jane
 Paul Schultze as Bill
 Bill Sage as Gus

Production
For the making of this film, his feature directorial debut, Hal Hartley said he was influenced by European art films, particularly those of Jean-Luc Godard, as well as by Howard Hawks and Preston Sturges.

Reception
The Unbelievable Truth received critical acclaim. On Rotten Tomatoes it has a 100% rating based on reviews from 10 critics. On Metacritic it has a score of 67 out of 100. 
Roger Ebert of the Chicago Sun-Times gave the film 3 out of four stars.

Box office
The film grossed $546,541 on a budget of an estimated $75,000.

Home video
The region 1 DVD was released by Anchor Bay Entertainment on March 11, 2001, but it has been discontinued. The DVD contained the film's trailer and an interview with Hartley. Possible Films, Hal Hartley's company, released a 20th Anniversary DVD on October 19, 2010. Olive Films released the film on Blu-ray and DVD on May 14, 2013.

References

External links
 The Unbelievable Truth at Hal Hartley's website
 
 

1989 films
1989 independent films
1980s romantic comedy-drama films
American romantic comedy-drama films
Films directed by Hal Hartley
Films set in 1988
Films set in New York City
Films shot in New York City
American independent films
American avant-garde and experimental films
1980s avant-garde and experimental films
1989 comedy films
1989 drama films
1989 directorial debut films
1980s English-language films
1980s American films